Interest is a feeling or emotion that causes attention to focus on an object, event, or process. In contemporary psychology of interest, the term is used as a general concept that may encompass other more specific psychological terms, such as curiosity and to a much lesser degree surprise.

The emotion of interest does have its own facial expression, of which the most prominent component is having dilated pupils.

Applications in computer assisted communication and B-C interface 
In 2016, an entirely new communication device and brain-computer interface was revealed, which required no visual fixation or eye movement at all, as with previous such devices.  Instead, the device assesses more covert interest, that is by assessing other indicators than eye fixation, on a chosen letter on a virtual keyboard. Each letter has its own (background) circle that is micro-oscillating in brightness in different time transitions, where the determination of letter selection is based on the best fit between first, unintentional pupil-size oscillation pattern and second, the circle-in-background's brightness oscillation pattern. Accuracy is additionally improved by the user's mental rehearsing of the words 'bright' and 'dark' in synchrony with the brightness transitions of the circle/letter.

Measurement of sexual interest 
In social science measurement methodology, when the intensity of (sexual) interest needs to be measured, the changes in pupil size – despite its weaker, but still consistent, correlations with other measures such as self-reported measures of sexual interest's orientation – have been proposed as its appropriate measure.

See also 
 Curiosity
 Ecstasy (emotion)
 Carroll Izard
 Surprise
 Attraction (emotion)

References

External links 
 A theory of different stages of interest (from noticing something, wondering about it, being curious, to being fascinated, astonished, and, in ecstasy)

Emotions